The discography of American rapper Meek Mill consists of five studio albums, six extended plays, one compilation album, three collaborative albums, eleven mixtapes, fifty-four singles (including twenty-three as a featured artist), ten promotional singles and thirty music videos.

Meek Mill's debut studio album, Dreams and Nightmares, was released in October 2012, which features the singles, "Amen" featuring Drake, "Burn" featuring Big Sean, "Young & Gettin' It" featuring Kirko Bangz and "Believe It" featuring Rick Ross. Meek Mill's second album, Dreams Worth More Than Money was released in June 2015. It reached number one on the US Billboard 200 and spawned the singles, "Check", "All Eyes on You" featuring Nicki Minaj and Chris Brown and "R.I.C.O." featuring Drake. Meek Mill released his third studio album, Wins & Losses in July 2017. More than one year later, he released his fourth studio album, Championships in November 2018. It became his second number one album on the Billboard 200 and featured his highest-charting single, "Going Bad", featuring Drake, hitting the top ten at number six on the Billboard Hot 100. His fifth studio album, Expensive Pain, was released on October 1, 2021.

Albums

Studio albums

Collaborative albums

Compilation albums

Commercial mixtapes

Mixtapes

Extended plays

Singles

As lead artist

As featured artist

Promotional singles

Other charted and certified songs

Guest appearances

Music videos

As lead artist

As featured artist

Notes

References

Discographies of American artists
Hip hop discographies